The Dead Indian Campsite is an archeological site in the Sunlight Basin of the Absaroka Mountains in Park County, Wyoming, United States. The site was found during the construction of the Sunlight Basin Road in 1967. The location was used as a butchering site, and excavations by the University of Wyoming in 1969 uncovered numerous stone tools, as well as the bones of elk, deer, mountain sheep, porcupine and wolf. A stone cairn was found to contain antler sets. The site was used in different eras for 4500 years.

The site was listed on the National Register of Historic Places in 1974.

See also
 Dead Indian Pass

References

External links
Dead Indian Campsite at the Wyoming State Historic Preservation Office

Archaeological sites on the National Register of Historic Places in Wyoming
Native American history of Wyoming
Geography of Park County, Wyoming
National Register of Historic Places in Park County, Wyoming